Tegotherium is an extinct mammaliaform from the Late Jurassic of East Asia. The type species T. gubini  is known from the Shar Teeg Beds of Mongolia and an indeterminate species is also known from the Late Jurassic Qigu Formation of China. It belongs to the clade Docodonta.

References

Docodonts
Fossil taxa described in 1994
Taxa named by Leonid Petrovich Tatarinov
Prehistoric cynodont genera